Sovetskiy Sakhalin is a black-and-white newspaper published in Yuzhno-Sakhalinsk, Russia.  It was founded on May 1, 1925.  It is distributed on Sakhalin and in the Kuril Islands and comes out four days a week, Tuesday through Friday.

As of 2007, 12,303 copies are distributed, 95 percent of which go out to subscribers.  The editor is Vladimir M. Sorochan.

External links
Official site

Newspapers published in the Soviet Union
Publications established in 1925
Sakhalin Oblast
Russian-language newspapers published in Russia
Yuzhno-Sakhalinsk